The Hawtai E70 or Hawtai Lusheng E70 (华泰 路盛 E70) is a compact sedan produced by Chinese auto maker Hawtai.

Overview

The Hawtai E70 was previewed as the Hawtai B21 concept on the 2010 Beijing Auto Show. The production version called the Lusheng E70 was launched on the Chinese car market in March 2013.

Power of the E70 comes from a 2.0 liter engine putting out 129 hp and 180 nm of torque through a 5-speed manual transmission or 4-speed automatic transmission powering the front wheels. The E70 features Macpherson front suspension and multi-link at rear. The petrol and diesel powered models were renamed to E80, while the electric model introduced in 2016 was renamed the Lusheng S5 iEV230.

Hawtai Lusheng E80/ Lusheng S5
The Hawtai Lusheng E80 was revealed in 2016 as an update of the E70. The E80 is powered by a single 1.5 liter diesel inline-4 DOHC engine, and in 2017 the model was renamed to Lusheng E5.

Hawtai Lusheng S5 iEV230/ Hawtai Lusheng S5 EV330
The Hawtai Lusheng S5 iEV230 is the electric variant of the Lusheng S5, and is powered by a 39 kWh electric motor.

The Hawtai Lusheng S5 EV330 pure electric vehicle is a battery electric concept car launched in 2018. The S5 EV330 is equipped with a 55 kWh battery delivering a range of 330 km ( 206 miles) rated by NEDC. The drivetrain of the S5 EV330s produces 107 hp (80 kW), and 220 N.m (162.3 lb.ft) of torque with a top speed of 130 km/h / 81 mph.

Export markets

As a brand Hawtai has been relatively active on the export front as of 2013, with Chinese automotive media listing North Korea, Iraq, Libya, Jordan, Russia, Egypt and Angola as the main export countries. In December 2013, Hawtai Motor exported 300 Hawtai Lusheng E70 taxis to North Korea with the taxis being deployed in the North Korean capital of Pyongyang.

References 

Cars introduced in 2013
2010s cars
Cars of China
Compact cars
Front-wheel-drive vehicles
Sedans
Taxi vehicles
Production electric cars